Lionel Olvin Bernard Cann (born 3 October 1972) is a Bermudian cricketer. He is an aggressive right-handed middle order batsman and a right-arm medium pace bowler. In his 22 ODI games to date he has struck 28 sixes. He has also represented Bermuda in ICC Intercontinental Cup matches, the ICC Americas Championship in 2004 and 2006, and in the Stanford 20/20 in 2006.

Cann was a member of the Bermudian side which made the Semi-finals of the 2005 ICC Trophy which earned them qualification for the 2007 World Cup. He made his One Day International debut against Canada on 17 May 2006, making 32 not out to guide the country to their first ever victory in ODI cricket.

In the ICC World Cricket League Division One tournament in Kenya prior to the World Cup he played a big part in Bermuda's only win, scoring an unbeaten 49 against Scotland as they chased 269 with an over to spare. His innings was part of a 134 run partnership with Irving Romaine, a national record.

After being either unbeaten or dismissed in the 40s on six occasions, Cann finally made an ODI half century in 2007 when he scored a 32 ball 52 against Kenya.

He made just 34 runs in the World Cup but 28 of those came against Sri Lanka, top scoring for his team.

External links
 

1972 births
Living people
Bermudian cricketers
Bermuda One Day International cricketers
Cricketers at the 2007 Cricket World Cup